Che Kuo Eruera Ness  (born 1974), better known by his stage name Che Fu, is a New Zealand hip hop, R&B and reggae artist, songwriter and producer.  A founding member of the band Supergroove, as a solo artist he has gone on to sell thousands of albums both in New Zealand and internationally. Che Fu is considered a pioneer of Hip hop and Pasifika music in New Zealand.

Early life 

Che Fu was born Che Ness in Auckland.  His mother, Miriama Rauhihi Ness is of Māori descent and his father Tigilau Ness is Niuean.  Fu's parents are well-known political activists, notably as members of the Polynesian-rights group, the Polynesian Panthers, and founding members of Rastafarian movement 12 Tribes of Israel. Tigilau is a musician and part of the band Unity Pacific as well as his son's band, The Krates.  The Ness family are Rastafarians.

Career

Supergroove (1994–1996) 
While a student at Western Springs College, Fu and a group of friends formed the Low Down Dirty Blues Band, who later became Supergroove. Supergroove released their debut album Traction in 1994.  The album went triple platinum in New Zealand and won five Tuis. Before finishing their second album, Backspacer, Fu left Supergroove to pursue a solo career.

Solo career (1996–1997) 
Fu was invited to record a single with well-known New Zealand DJ DLT. The song "Chains" protested French nuclear testing in the Pacific and was released in July 1996, within weeks of Fu leaving Supergroove.  "Chains" was a Number One hit on the New Zealand Singles Charts and won three Tuis, namely Single of the year, Best male vocalist, and Best songwriter. This marked the beginning of Fu's solo career and brought prominence to Hip Hop in New Zealand.

2b S.Pacific (1998–2000) 

In 1998 Fu released his debut album 2b S.Pacific.  The album went double platinum and spawned four top-ten hits, which was unheard-of for a local hip hop artist at the time.  The following year, he received the Single of the year award for Scene III. Fu subsequently formed a band named The Krates for studio work and live performances.  Paul Russell, previous drummer for Supergroove, is part of The Krates line-up.

Navigator (2001–2003) 

Fu released his follow-up album Navigator in 2001, debuting at number one and generating triple platinum sales. At the 2002 New Zealand Music Awards, Fu took home five tuis: Single of the year for "Fade Away", Album of the year, Top male vocalist, Best R&B / Hip hop album, and Best music video. That same year, Fu received the APRA Silver Scroll for his single "Misty Frequencies". He went on to win Best male vocalist in 2003 for "Misty Frequencies".

Beneath the Radar and Hi-Score: The Best of Che Fu (2005–2007) 
Fu's next album Beneath the Radar was released in 2005, led out by singles "2D" and "Lightwork". However, the record was not as successful as previous works.  The following year Fu released Hi-Score – The Best of Che Fu, a compilation of hit singles from his previous three albums including "Fade Away", "Waka" and "Without a Doubt", as well as four new singles.

Collaborations (2008) 
Fu teamed up with the Glass Packaging Forum to promote glass recycling with youth. The Forum hosted a competition for 9- to 15-year-olds to write rap lyrics encouraging recycling. The winners recorded their lyrics with Fu in a single called "Do the krusher".

Fu also collaborated with Kimbra and hip hop group Nesian Mystik on their top-ten single "Mr Mista".

Hedlok (2010–2013) 
Che Fu & The Krates continued to tour New Zealand and Australia.  As well, Fu performs alongside another hip hop legend, Samoan rapper King Kapisi as one-half of the group Hedlok.

Lifetime Achievement Award (2014) 
Fu's contribution to New Zealand music was recognised when he was awarded the Lifetime Achievement Award at the 2014 Pacific Music Awards.

Personal life 
In 2011, Fu and his father Tigilau were featured in a documentary for Māori TV in which they travelled to their homeland of Mutalau, Niue for the first time together.  While in Niue, Fu married his long-time partner Angela McDonald. Fu and his wife have four sons, Loxmyn, Marley, Jeru, and Kaselle, whom they are raising in the Rastafarian faith.

Fu is also a serious sneaker collector. Fu developed his love for sneakers in 1989 when he purchased his first pair of Air Jordan IV. Along with a few of his friends, including Dj Sir-vere, they created the PacHeat Crew and regularly organises the biggest sneaker swap meet events in New Zealand. One of his favourite sneakers is Air Jordan IV Retro Black Laser which he stated in New Zealand Sneakerhead Documentary 2021.

Discography

Studio albums

With Supergroove

 Traction (1994) BMG
 Backspacer (1996) BMG
 Postage (2003) BMG

Singles

Honours and awards
 2002 – APRA Silver Scroll Awards: Che Ness (Che Fu) and Godfrey de Grut, "Misty Frequencies"
 2009 – Appointed a Member of the New Zealand Order of Merit, for services to music, in the 2009 Queen's Birthday Honours
 2014 – Pacific Music Awards Lifetime Achievement Award

RIANZ Awards

References

External links
AudioCulture profile
 Che Fu The Musician
 MusicBrainz Page
Che Fu Instagram

1974 births
APRA Award winners
New Zealand people of Niuean descent
New Zealand Māori musicians
New Zealand hip hop musicians
Hip hop record producers
New Zealand singer-songwriters
New Zealand rappers
Members of the New Zealand Order of Merit
Living people
Musicians from Auckland
Pacific reggae
Māori-language singers